The 2012 Winmau World Masters was a major televised tournament on the BDO/WDF calendar for 2012. It took place from 11 to 14 October, with 11 October play at the Costello Stadium for the untelevised matches, and 12–14 October play at the Hull City Hall, which hosted the televised element of the event for the second time, taking over from the nearby Hull Arena who hosted for one year in 2011

Scott Waites and Lisa Ashton both attempted to defend their titles they won for the first time last year, however Stephen Bunting and Julie Gore took the main titles after Waites and Ashton lost their opening matches. This tournament was known for being Phill Nixon's last major tournament. Nixon died on 9 August 2013 from cancer.

Seeds

Men

These were finalised on completion of the 2012 British Open on 31 August – 2 September. In a change to previous years, there are 32 seeds (an increase from 8 between 2007 and 2011) with the Top 16 exempt until the Last 32 stage, rather than 8 seeds being exempt until the last 16 stage.

  Stephen Bunting
  Martin Adams
  Scott Waites
  Robbie Green
  Wesley Harms
  Alan Norris
  Tony O'Shea
  Ross Montgomery
  Jan Dekker
  Gary Robson
  Scott Mitchell
  Martin Atkins
  Geert De Vos
  Steve Douglas
  Richie George
  Benito van de Pas
  Garry Thompson
  Paul Jennings
  John Walton
  Tony Eccles
  Darryl Fitton
  Martin Phillips
  Willy van de Wiel
  Christian Kist
  Mark Barilli
  Jimmy Hendriks
  James Wilson
  Jeffrey de Graaf
  Wayne Warren
  Gary Stone
  Ewan Hyslop
  Daryl Gurney

Women

These were finalised on completion of the 2012 British Open on 31 August – 2 September. The ladies seeds enter at the start of the competition however can not play each other until the quarter final stage.

  Deta Hedman
  Anastasia Dobromyslova
  Julie Gore
  Irina Armstrong
  Lorraine Farlam
  Trina Gulliver
  Tamara Schuur
  Dee Bateman
The defending champion Lisa Ashton was unseeded due to her relative inactivity on the Tour

There are no seedings in the boys or girls events.

Men's Draw

Last 32 onwards. All the below matches were played on stage, with a number televised.

Sets are best of 3 legs.

Ladies Draw

Last 8 onwards. The Semi-finals and final were played on stage, with the final televised.

Boys Draw

Last 8 onwards.  The final was played on stage however this was not televised.

Girls Draw

Last 8 onwards.  The final was played on stage however this was not televised.

Television coverage
The tournament was shown in the UK by sports subscription channel ESPN for the second year. ESPN broadcast the last three days of the tournament, and televised the Last 8 of the Men's stage matches, the majority of the Last 32 and Last 16 of the Men's stage matches, and the final of the Ladies event.

References

World Masters (darts)
World Masters
World Masters (darts)
Sport in Kingston upon Hull
2010s in Kingston upon Hull